Computer Networks is a scientific journal of computer and telecommunications networking published by Elsevier.

See also 
 List of scientific journals

References

External links 
 

Computer science journals
Elsevier academic journals
English-language journals
Journals published between 13 and 25 times per year